Percy Greene (1897–1977) travelled the United States spreading awareness of the mistreatment blacks endured at the polls. Greene created the Jackson Advocate, Mississippi's first and oldest black-owned newspaper.

Biography

Early life 
Percy Greene was born on September 7, 1897 in Jackson, Mississippi. He was one of twelve children born to George Washington Green and Sarah Stone. At the age of 17, Greene joined the army. Greene studied law under black attorney-physician Sidney D. Redmond and attended Jackson State University. Greene is in the Jackson State University Hall of Fame for his football talent. 

Greene was denied a career as a lawyer because the State bar refused to recognize his high exam scores. His other early jobs included mail carrier for the U.S. Postal Service, magazine salesman with Tuskegee Institute, and the Civilian Conservation Corps. On June 16, 1921, Greene married Frances Lee Reed. The couple had two children: Frances Lorraine and Gwendolyn Louise.

The Jackson Advocate newspaper 
In 1938 Percy Greene started the Jackson Advocate newspaper, now Mississippi's oldest black-owned newspaper.

Voting rights advocacy 
Greene advocated for equal rights, justice and opportunities and spoke about the Mississippi poll tax and the intimidation blacks suffered at the polls. He spoke all over Mississippi and was recognized in the Pittsburgh Courier on their "Top Ten Honor Roll" two years in a row. Eventually he began speaking in Chicago, Detroit, Los Angeles, New York, and Washington D.C.

President Harry S. Truman, after hearing about Greene’s speech, called the Jackson Advocate office and asked what Percy needed in Mississippi and how he could help. Greene said "We need the vote Mr. President. We need the vote…without intimidation, or poll tax... we need the right to vote and the protection of the federal government." The following year, 1948, Percy Greene was photographed as he voted for the first time. By 1948, the Advocate circulated 3,000 papers and rose to 10,000 in 1973. 

He was critical of the NAACP and requested funding from the Sovereignty Commission.

Death 
Percy Greene died on April 16, 1977.

Further reading

References

External links
Oral History with Mr. Percy Greene
Mississippi Jim Crow
JA: World War II

People from Jackson, Mississippi
1897 births
1977 deaths
American newspaper publishers (people)
Activists for African-American civil rights
Civilian Conservation Corps people
Jackson State University alumni
Journalists from Mississippi
20th-century American journalists
American male journalists